Johnny Smith is an album by Jazz guitarist Johnny Smith, which was released in 1967 through Verve Records. A compact disc, with extra material, was released in 1997.

Track listing

Personnel
Johnny Smith – guitar
George Duvivier – bass
Hank Jones – piano
Don Lamond – drums
Stanley Dance – liner notes
Bob Arnold – Engineering
Teddy Reig – Production

References

External links
 

1967 albums
Verve Records albums